The 2018 New Zealand Grand Prix event for open wheel racing cars was held at Circuit Chris Amon near Feilding on 11 February 2018. It was the sixty-third New Zealand Grand Prix and fielded Toyota Racing Series cars. The event was also the third race of the fifth round of the 2018 Toyota Racing Series, the final race of the series.

Report

Qualifying

Race

References

New Zealand Grand Prix
New Zealand Grand Prix
New Zealand Grand Prix